George John Fitzgerald Ferris (born October 18, 1964 in Antigua) is a former first-class cricketer who played for the Leeward Islands and Leicestershire. A right-arm fast bowler, Ferris took 286 wickets at 25.71 in his career between 1983 and 1990. His cousin Hamish Anthony played ODI cricket for the West Indies.

Ferris became a regular in the Leicestershire side in the late 1980s when the other overseas Leicestershire player and fellow West Indian Winston Benjamin was on duty playing for the West Indies. Although Ferris played cricket for the Leeward Islands he was never selected by the West Indies due to the strength of the bowling attack the West Indies had at the time. He took his best figures in 1983 in his fourth match for Leicestershire, when he took 7 for 42 and 3 for 62; seven of his victims were out leg before wicket.

After his career ended he moved to Florida in the US.

References

External links 
 

1964 births
Living people
Leicestershire cricketers
Leeward Islands cricketers
Antigua and Barbuda cricketers
People from Saint Mary Parish, Antigua